Aaron Paul Bean (born January 25, 1967) is an American politician serving as the U.S. representative for Florida's 4th congressional district since 2023. A Republican, Bean represented the 4th district in the Florida Senate, which included all of Nassau County and parts of Duval County, from 2012 to 2022. From 2000 to 2008, he represented the 12th district in the Florida House of Representatives.

Florida Senate
In 2012, when Florida Senate districts were reconfigured, the 4th district was drawn to include all of Nassau County, and parts of Duval County, taking in most of Jacksonville's northern suburbs. Bean opted to run in the newly created district, and faced State Representative Mike Weinstein in the Republican primary. He was endorsed by former Governor of Florida Jeb Bush, Chief Financial Officer Jeff Atwater, Agriculture Commissioner Adam Putnam, the Florida Chamber of Commerce, and the National Rifle Association. Bean campaigned on increasing the region's political power and clout in state politics, saying, "We're going to...really strengthen our region and fight as we compete with the Tampas and the Miamis." He defeated Weinstein in the primary election with 64% of the vote to Weinstein's 36%, and advanced to the general election, where he faced Democratic nominee Nancy Soderberg, a former high-ranking official at the United States National Security Council and an ambassador during the Clinton Administration. During the election, Soderberg attacked Bean for taking campaign contributions from health care companies and for cutting education in the 2008 state budget, while Bean campaigned on increasing school choice for parents, arguing, "We need to give parents the right to choose where they send their kids," and once again on increasing the region's ability to fight for its interests, saying, "We need to hustle through leadership, hustle through skills." Despite the election's contentiousness and Soderberg's high profile, it was not close, with Bean winning his first term in the Florida Senate with 62% of the vote.

While serving in the Senate, Bean proposed legislation during the 2013 legislative session that, in addressing the Medicaid expansion provided for under the Patient Protection and Affordable Care Act, "would reject the $51 billion offered over the next decade for expansion under Obamacare and use state money...to set up a healthcare marketplace under Florida Health Choices, a system he helped set up in 2008 as a member of the House." During the 2014 legislative session, he staked out a position in opposition to legislation that would give the children of undocumented immigrants, who live in the country illegally, the ability to pay in-state tuition at state universities, arguing, "I know it feels good giving benefits away. We are giving so many benefits to non-citizens...does it matter even being an American citizen anymore?" He voted for the controversial Senate Bill 86 in 2021.

U.S. House of Representatives

Elections

2022 

Bean announced his candidacy to represent Florida's 4th district in Congress on June 3, 2022. He campaigned on lowering inflation and securing the southern border of the U.S. He defeated two opponents in the Republican primary with 68% of the vote. In the general election, Bean defeated Democratic nominee LaShonda Holloway with 60% of the vote.

Caucus memberships 

 Republican Main Street Partnership

Tenure

Syria 
In 2023, Bean was among 47 Republicans to vote in favor of H.Con.Res. 21 which directed President Joe Biden to remove U.S. troops from Syria within 180 days.

References

External links
 Congressman Aaron Bean official U.S. House website
Our Campaigns – Aaron Bean (FL) profile
 Campaign website
 
 

|-

|-

|-

|-

1967 births
21st-century American politicians
Jacksonville University alumni
Living people
People from Fernandina Beach, Florida
Republican Party Florida state senators
Republican Party members of the Florida House of Representatives
Republican Party members of the United States House of Representatives from Florida